ART Grand Prix is a French motor racing team that competes in formula single-seaters in Europe. In 2012, it competed in the GP2 Series and GP3 Series as Lotus GP to reflect sponsorship from British sports and racing car manufacturer Lotus. The team competed as Lotus ART in 2011.

Corporate history
ART Grand Prix was created in 2005 as a collaborative project between Frédéric Vasseur, the principal of ASM Formule 3, and Nicolas Todt, the son of the then Scuderia Ferrari team principal and eventually Fédération Internationale de l'Automobile (FIA) president Jean Todt. Vasseur wanted to expand his championship-winning Formula Three team into the newly created GP2 Series, while Nicolas Todt had expressed an interest in team management. He had become involved in motorsport as a driver manager, and was notable for representing Felipe Massa. Todt took charge of the new team's commercial and promotional interests, while Vasseur managed the day-to-day running of the operation. ART is based at the ASM workshops at Villeneuve-la-Guyard in the département of Yonne, France.

Todt sold his shares in December 2018.

Racing history

Formula Renault and Formula Three
ASM had already competed in European and French Formula Renault 2.0 before expanding its operations to include the Formula 3 Euroseries in 2003. In 2004, the team dominated, with drivers Jamie Green and Alexandre Prémat finishing first and second in the drivers' championship – the latter also winning the 2004 Macau Grand Prix. The trend continued after ART was formed: the team won five straight teams' titles from the award's inauguration in 2005 to 2009, and won the drivers' championships in these years with Lewis Hamilton, Paul di Resta, Romain Grosjean, Nico Hülkenberg and Jules Bianchi respectively. Future Formula One drivers Adrian Sutil, Sebastian Vettel and Kamui Kobayashi also achieved success with the team. In 2010, ART's stranglehold on the championship was broken by French rivals Signature, who fielded Edoardo Mortara to victory in a Volkswagen-powered car, ahead of ART's lead driver Valtteri Bottas, who was the lead Mercedes-powered driver. At the end of the season, ART withdrew from the F3 Euroseries to concentrate on the GP2 and GP3 Series.

In September 2019, ART stated their intention to return to the Formula Renault Eurocup championship for the 2020 season and were subsequently confirmed two months later. The team entered the season with series regular Grégoire Saucy and Mercedes junior Paul Aron.

GP2 Series

ART Grand Prix was one of several teams to enter the new GP2 Series in 2005. In the team's debut season, it employed F3 Euroseries graduates Alexandre Prémat, of France, and Nico Rosberg, of Germany. Against drivers who had prior experience at this level, from Formula 3000, Rosberg became the inaugural GP2 Drivers' Champion. He showed consistency, with points scoring results at every race meeting, and his championship challenge became stronger as the year progressed. Prémat was 4th in the championship, which was enough to provide ART with the Teams' Championship title. Rosberg's increasingly rapid rise to the top continued when he graduated to Formula One with Williams.

Prémat remained with ART in 2006, and was joined by Britain's Lewis Hamilton. He was a logical choice, having dominated the F3 Euroseries with ASM Formule 3, ART's sister team. Hamilton took an impressive title in his debut season, though his performances faltered slightly mid-season against an increased challenge from the eventual runner-up, Nelson Piquet Jr. Prémat was a consistent and reliable number two to Hamilton; his third position in the Drivers' Championship contributed to ART's second consecutive Teams' title.

For the 2007 season, ART signed Michael Ammermüller and Lucas di Grassi. Ammermüller's campaign was hampered by injury, and he was later dropped in favour of Sébastien Buemi, with Mikhail Aleshin also deputising. Di Grassi emerged as the team's leader, his consistent finishing record allowing him to finish as runner-up in the drivers' championship to Timo Glock despite winning only a single race. The points he accumulated also allowed ART to salvage second in the teams' championship, in spite of the fact that the drivers of the team's other car scored a mere ten points between them.

ART's driver line-up changed again for 2008, with the experienced Luca Filippi partnered by series rookie Romain Grosjean. Grosjean quickly established himself as the number one, winning two races and taking several additional podium finishes en route to fourth in the drivers' championship, only 14 points behind champion Giorgio Pantano. By contrast, Filippi was dropped after scoring points just twice in the first half of the year; he was replaced by Sakon Yamamoto, who also failed to trouble the leading runners despite his Formula One experience. The team slipped to fifth in the championship.

The 2009 season saw another complete overhaul of the team's driving strength, with Pastor Maldonado joining from Minardi Piquet Sports and Nico Hülkenberg graduating to the series as the reigning Formula 3 Euroseries champion. The season soon developed into a contest between Hülkenberg and the two Addax drivers, Grosjean and Vitaly Petrov. Grosjean left the series mid-season after being called up by the Renault F1 team, and Hülkenberg prevailed over Petrov with a total of five victories and 100 points. Maldonado started the year brightly with two sprint-race wins in the first half of the season, but his form tailed off later on, restricting him to sixth in the championship. Nevertheless, ART's tally of points was enough for the outfit to win its third teams' championship in five years.

Another clear-out for the 2010 season resulted in the team signing Jules Bianchi and Sam Bird, two rookies from the F3 Euroseries, which Bianchi had won the previous season with ART. The two were closely matched and featured at or near the front of the field for much of the season, but their inexperience precluded them from challenging for the championship as the GP2 Series became more established with a growing number of experienced drivers. They finished third (Bianchi) and fifth (Bird) in the drivers' championship, with ART finishing in third place in the teams' championship.

For the 2011 season, ART reached an agreement with Lotus Cars to run under the Lotus ART moniker. The team switched from its traditional white-and-red livery to a Team Lotus-inspired green-and-yellow scheme, although this was somewhat confusing as Lotus Cars (sponsoring the Renault team) was involved in a legal dispute in Formula One with a new incarnation of Team Lotus (now Caterham) over the use of the name. Team Lotus was also competing with a green-and-yellow livery, whereas Renault (competing as Lotus Renault GP) was running a black-and-gold colour scheme reminiscent of the original Team Lotus's association with John Player Specials. As for the drivers, Bianchi was retained alongside Esteban Gutiérrez, who was promoted to GP2 after winning the inaugural GP3 Series championship with ART. Bianchi retained his third place in the championship but his season was slightly disappointing as he failed to mount a championship challenge despite his greater experience and his status as a pre-season favourite, whilst Gutiérrez played himself in with a single victory on his way to 13th place in the championship. ART again slipped to fifth in the teams' championship.

The deal with Lotus was extended for the 2012 season, with the team name adjusted to Lotus GP and the colour scheme now altered to match the black-and-gold livery used by the Lotus F1 team, the Renault name having been dropped and the dispute with Caterham solved. With Bianchi moving to the Formula Renault 3.5 Series, another ART GP3 graduate, James Calado, was signed to partner Gutiérrez. The second-year driver improved to third place in the drivers' championship with three victories, albeit someway behind title protagonists Davide Valsecchi and Luiz Razia, whilst Calado impressed by winning twice and finishing fifth overall as the season's top rookie driver. In 2014, the team finished 3rd in the constructor's championship whilst rookie Stoffel Vandoorne finished as GP2 runner-up.

The team entered the 2015 season with Vandoorne and McLaren protégé Nobuharu Matsushita as their drivers. The team scored eight victories, with Vandoorne claiming the driver's title at Sochi, and claimed its first Team Championship since 2009.

The team went into the 2016 season with Matsushita and Sergey Sirotkin racing with them. They finished fourth in the constructors standings with Sirotkin finishing third in the drivers championship.

FIA Formula 2 Championship
In  GP2 Series was renamed into FIA Formula 2 Championship, Matsushita remained with the team for a third season in a Dallara GP2/11 car with 2016 GP3 runner-up Alexander Albon joining him.

For  the team promoted their 2017 GP3 Series drivers Jack Aitken and George Russell.

In  the team will be represented by 2018 GP3 Series driver Nikita Mazepin and their 2016 GP3 Series driver Nyck de Vries. Jack Aitken left the team to switch to Campos. While Mazepin struggled to replicate his GP3 performances, de Vries scored four victories and sealed the title in Sochi, while the team finished third in the teams' standings.

The team went into the new decade with Ferrari and Renault juniors Marcus Armstrong and Christian Lundgaard contesting the 2020 championship.

GP3 Series
ART signed up for the first season of the new GP3 Series, the feeder category of GP2, in 2010.  The team immediately replicated its success in other series, with Esteban Gutiérrez becoming the inaugural champion. Team-mates Alexander Rossi and Pedro Nunes finished fourth and 24th respectively, and ART won the teams' championship. The 2011 season saw ART's success continue, with the championship distilling into a battle between its two leading drivers, ART F3 Euroseries graduate Valtteri Bottas and James Calado, with the former winning by seven points. The remaining seat was initially taken by Nunes, but he was dropped after a disappointing run and replaced by Richie Stanaway, who also scored points and helped ART to its second straight teams' championship. All three of ART's 2012 drivers were competitive, securing a third straight teams' championship, but neither won the drivers' title: Daniel Abt's late-season charge brought him up just short of victor Mitch Evans, whilst his early-season rival Aaro Vainio fell away to take fourth, and Conor Daly was also a consistent frontrunner in sixth place overall.

In 2013, Daly was retained with Facu Regalia and British F3 champion Jack Harvey joining the team. The team claimed their fourth constructors championship title, with Daly finishing third in the overall standings and Regalia finishing runner-up to Arden's Daniil Kvyat.

2014 saw ART race with Alex Fontana, Dino Zamparelli and GP3 debutant Marvin Kirchhöfer. By losing the titles to Alex Lynn and Carlin, 2014 also marked the first time ART failed to win the constructor's title.

For 2015, Kirchhöfer was retained with Alfonso Celis Jr. joining from Status Grand Prix and 2014 FIA Formula 3 European champion Esteban Ocon making his GP3 debut with the team. The team secured the team's title in Bahrain, with Ocon securing the championship in the following round after a close duel with Trident's Luca Ghiotto.

The following season, McLaren junior Nyck de Vries, Ferrari junior Charles Leclerc, Nirei Fukuzumi and Alexander Albon formed the team's driver line-up. The team claimed their sixth constructors title at Monza, with Leclerc and Albon claiming the roles of champion and vice-champion respectively.

In 2017, Fukuzumi was retained while Renault Sport Academy member Jack Aitken, Mercedes junior George Russell and Anthoine Hubert were signed to the team.

For the last season of the GP3 Series, the squad retained Hubert and signed trio of FIA Formula 3 European Championship drivers Jake Hughes, Callum Ilott and Nikita Mazepin.

FIA Formula 3 Championship
In October 2018, ART was listed among ten teams to compete in the inaugural FIA Formula 3 Championship. In December, the team named David Beckmann as their first driver, with Renault juniors Christian Lundgaard and Max Fewtrell confirmed the following month. The team ended its maiden season third in the teams standing, with Lundgaard claiming their sole win in the feature race at the Hungaroring.

The following season, the team signed Formula Renault Eurocup race winner Aleksandr Smolyar and reigning ADAC Formula 4 champion Théo Pourchaire.

Deutsche Tourenwagen Masters
After a successful single-seaters racing category for many years, ART Grand Prix expanded their Deutsche Tourenwagen Masters involvement as it was proposed on 29 November 2014 later announced on 22 April 2015 and thus fielded two Mercedes-Benz AMG C63 Class Coupé DTM cars and thus provided full-works support from Mercedes-AMG. In 2015, Mercedes Team ART Grand Prix was fielded by British driver Gary Paffett and Austrian rookie driver Lucas Auer. Mercedes Team ART Grand Prix was scored only one pole position courtesy of Gary Paffett in Hockenheim race 2 qualifying. In 2016, Mercedes Team ART Grand Prix once again involved in DTM. Gary Paffett and Esteban Ocon were the drivers. Ocon was replaced by Felix Rosenqvist from Moscow round due to his departure to Formula One with Manor Racing as a replacement for Rio Haryanto who was cut short due to personal sponsorship funding problems. Mercedes Team ART Grand Prix once again was scored only one pole position courtesy of Gary Paffett in Moscow race 1 qualifying and 2 podiums. Due to DTM reducing their competitors from 24 to 18 cars (6 per manufacturer) from 2017 season as well as concentrating on junior single-seater formulas, ART Grand Prix officially ceased their DTM operations after just two seasons.

On 13 February 2020 it was announced that the ART Grand Prix team would return to Deutsche Tourenwagen Masters after three-year hiatus and thus hiring former BMW Sauber Formula One driver Robert Kubica as a full-time Deutsche Tourenwagen Masters rookie for 2020 season.

FIA World Endurance Championship
The team provided technical support for SMP Racing in the LMP1 Class of the 2018 FIA World Endurance Championship.

Formula One entry bid
ART launched an entry into Formula One as one of many candidates to fill in the 13th slot for the  Formula One season with a possible partnership from the now-defunct Toyota Racing Grand Prix team. The team also announced that it was going to phase out its Formula 3 operation because it wanted to focus only on GP3 and GP2. The 2010 Formula 3 season proved to be ART Grand Prix's last. ART Grand Prix announced their entry bid for F1 on 13 May 2010.

However, on 7 July 2010, ART announced in its official statement the withdrawal of its entry bid, declaring that "ART Grand Prix had forged strong bonds with several technical and financial partners but with unfavourable economic conditions they could not gather the necessary guarantees to ensure the stability of the project in the long term." As revealed by one of the Formula One insiders during the Czech TV NOVA live coverage of the 2010 British Grand Prix, one of the crucial partners was Michelin, who did not succeed in their efforts to become an official Formula One tyre supplier from 2011.

GPX Racing
ART Grand Prix also provide technical support to United Arab Emirates-based endurance racing team GP Extreme (GPX) Racing.

Current series results

FIA Formula 2 Championship

In detail
(key) (Races in bold indicate pole position) (Races in italics indicate fastest lap)

* Season still in progress.

FIA Formula 3 Championship

In detail
(key) (Races in bold indicate pole position) (Races in italics indicate fastest lap)

* Season still in progress.

Formula Regional European Championship

† Masson drove for FA Racing by MP prior to round 7, while Boya drove for MP Motorsport from round 7 onwards.

In detail 
(key) (Races in bold indicate pole position) (Races in italics indicate fastest lap)

Former series results

Formula 3 Euro Series

 ART Grand Prix competed under the name ASM Formule 3 from 2003 to 2007.

GP2 Series

In detail
(key) (Races in bold indicate pole position) (Races in italics indicate fastest lap)

GP2 Asia Series

GP3 Series

In detail 
(key) (Races in bold indicate pole position) (Races in italics indicate fastest lap)

Deutsche Tourenwagen Masters

Formula Renault Eurocup

*Season in progress.
 ART Grand Prix competed under the name ASM from 2002 to 2003.

Timeline

Notes

References

External links
 

French auto racing teams
Auto racing teams established in 1991
1991 establishments in France
Formula 3 Euro Series teams
Formula Renault Eurocup teams
GP2 Series teams
GP3 Series teams
Blancpain Endurance Series teams
European Le Mans Series teams
British Formula Three teams
French Formula 3 teams
Deutsche Tourenwagen Masters teams
FIA Formula 2 Championship teams
FIA Formula 3 Championship teams
Mercedes-Benz in motorsport
Formula Regional European Championship teams